The men's high jump was an event at the 1996 Summer Olympics in Atlanta, Georgia. There were 38 competitors from 28 nations, with one non-starter (three-time medalist Patrik Sjöberg). The maximum number of athletes per nation had been set at 3 since the 1930 Olympic Congress. The event was won by Charles Austin of the United States, the nation's first victory in the men's high jump since 1968 and 13th overall. Artur Partyka of Poland became the seventh man to win two medals in the event, following his 1992 bronze with silver in these Games. Steve Smith's bronze was Great Britain's first medal in the men's high jump since 1908.

Background

This was the 23rd appearance of the event, which is one of 12 athletics events to have been held at every Summer Olympics. The returning finalists from the 1992 Games were gold medalist Javier Sotomayor of Cuba, bronze medalists Artur Partyka of Poland and Tim Forsyth of Australia, seventh-place finisher Troy Kemp of the Bahamas, eighth-place finishers Charles Austin of the United States and Dragutin Topić of Yugoslavia (an Independent Olympic Participant in 1992), and twelfth-place finisher Steve Smith of Great Britain. Sotomayor had broken his own world record in 1993, jumping 2.45 metres for a mark that is still standing in 2021; however, he was suffering from an ankle injury in Atlanta. Austin, by contrast, had recovered from injuries that had limited him. Kemp was the reigning world champion, while Partyka had placed in the top three at worlds in both 1993 and 1995.

Colombia, the Czech Republic, the Dominican Republic, Malaysia, and Ukraine each made their debut in the event. The United States made its 22nd appearance, most of any nation, having missed only the boycotted 1980 Games.

Competition format

The competition used the two-round format introduced in 1912. There were two distinct rounds of jumping with results cleared between rounds. Jumpers were eliminated if they had three consecutive failures, whether at a single height or between multiple heights if they attempted to advance before clearing a height.

The qualifying round had the bar set at 2.10 metres, 2.15 metres, 2.20 metres, 2.24 metres, 2.26 metres, and 2.29 metres. All jumpers clearing 2.29 metres in the qualifying round advanced to the final. If fewer than 12 jumpers could achieve it, the top 12 (including ties) would advance to the final.

The final had jumps at 2.15 metres, 2.20 metres, 2.25 metres, 2.29 metres, 2.32 metres, 2.35 metres, 2.37 metres, 2.39 metres, and 2.41 metres; the winner also took attempts at 2.46 metres to try to break the world record.

Records

These were the standing world and Olympic records (in metres) prior to the 1996 Summer Olympics.

Charles Austin set a new Olympic record with 2.39 metres.

Schedule

All times are Eastern Daylight Time (UTC-4)

Results

Qualifying round

Qualification: Qualifying Performance 2.28 (Q) or at least 12 best performers (q) advance to the final.

Final

See also
 1994 Men's European Championships (Helsinki)
 1995 Men's World Championships (Gothenburg)
 1997 Men's World Championships (Athens)
 1998 Men's European Championships (Budapest)

References

External links
 Official Report
 Results

H
High jump at the Olympics
Men's events at the 1996 Summer Olympics